Avižieniai Eldership is an eldership in Lithuania, located in Vilnius District Municipality, northwest of Vilnius. It is the most populous eldership in the municipality.

Geography 
The eldership has a hillfort with a cultural layer dated to the beginning of 1st millennium A.D. The landscape is dominated by rolling hills in the Riešė Upland. Many small wooded areas and swamps, but the landscape is undergoing rapid change due to suburbanization and its proximity to the city. Notable rivers include Riešė and Čekonė, and there are several small lakes, such as Gilužis, Ežeraitis, Notiškis and Varlinka.

History 
Avižieniai were known since the Interwar for their gardens. In the 19th-century, an orthodox church was built in Bukiškis. It was damaged during World War II, and only ruins and the basement remain, and are known to have the buried corpses of a general. The church rebuilding project was initiated in 1990, and the church was rebuilt in 2007.

Populated places 
There are 27 villages located within the eldership, the largest of which areAvižieniai, Bukiškis, Riešė (of which only half of the village is located in the eldership, the other half belongs to Riešė Eldership), Bendoriai and Klevinė.

Notable locations 

 Bukiškės Orthodox Church of Patron Mother of God
 Avižieniai hillfort
 Mažoji Riešė hillfort
 Pikutiškės/Švedai hillfort
 Aukštieji Rusokai tumulus
 Galinė Manor with preserved palace and farmhouses
 Kalno Riešė Manor farmhouse fragments near Riešė
 Tarandė old cemetery
 World War II Soviet soldier burial place in Bendoriai

Ethnic composition 
According to 2011 National Census data, the ethnic composition is as follows:

 Lithuanians - 65.0%
 Poles - 24.4%
 Russians - 5.6%

According to 2021 census, out of 10,867 persons of the eldership:
 Lithuanians - 70.9% (7704)
 Poles - 18.8% (2043)
 Russians - 5.1% (559)
 Belarusians - 1.4% (157)

Gallery

References 

Elderships in Vilnius District Municipality